Spyridon Kalentzis is a Greek rower from Corfu. In 2018, he won a bronze medal for Greece, at the 2018 Mediterranean Games.

References

Greek male rowers
Living people
1996 births
Mediterranean Games bronze medalists for Greece
Mediterranean Games medalists in rowing
Competitors at the 2018 Mediterranean Games
Sportspeople from Corfu
21st-century Greek people